Özge Kanbay (4 November 199625 February 2019) was a Turkish women's footballer, and female football referee. She was also a rugby sevens player. The 2019–20 Turkish women's football season and the 2020 Turkish Women's Rugby sevens League season were named in honor of her, after she died in February 2019 from cancer.

Private life
Kanbay was born in Hamburg, Germany, on 4 November 1996. She has an elder sister Gamze Kanbay Özkan.

Kanbay was a final grade student of physical education and sports teaching in the Faculty of Sports Sciences at the Manisa Celal Bayar University (MCBÜ).

Playing career
Kanbay obtained her footballer license from the İzmir-based club Karşıyaka BESEM Spor on 31 October 2013. She appeared for her team in 14 matches of the 2013-14 Women's Second League and scored four goals. Her team finished the league season as group runner-up. She enjoyed her team's promotion to the Women's First League in the 2014–15 season. She capped in ten matches of the Women's First League. At the end of the season, her team was relegated to the Second League. She then transferred to Manisa Esnaf GS to play in the Women's Third League. After appearing in six matches and netting six goals in the first half of the season, she ended her football playing career.

Kanbay was also a rugby sevens player.

Officiating career
Kanbay began her officiating career on 9 September 2016 as an assistant referee in a Regional Development Boys U-15 match. On 3 December the same year, she officiated a Regional Development Boys U-14 match as referee. She served as an assistant referee in a Women's Third League match on 25 December 2016. She was tasked as the fourth official in a Men's U-21 match on 17 September 2017, and the as referee again in a Men's U-21 match on 30 September that year. On 3 December 2017, Kanbay officiated for the first time a Women's First League match as a referee. She continued her career as referee mostly for Men's U-21 and Women's First League matches. She served at various positions in 56 matches until 7 May 2018.

Illness and death
Kanbay contracted uterine cancer. She was hospitalized in the Hafsa Sultan Hospital of the MCBÜ in Manisa for treatment, where she died at the age of 22 on 25 February 2019.

Legacy
The Turkish Football Federation named the 2019-20 women's football league seasons in her commemoration. The Turkish Rugby Federation dedicated the 2020 Women's Rugby sevens League season to Özge Kanbay. The newly established women's beach rugby team, named "Özge Kanbay" in honor of her, won the women's category of the 4th International Istanbul Beach rugby tournament held in Kadıköy, Istanbul in mid July 2019.

References

1996 births
Sportspeople from Hamburg
German people of Turkish descent
Manisa Celal Bayar University alumni
Turkish women's footballers
Karşıyaka BESEM Spor players
Turkish football referees
Female rugby sevens players
2019 deaths
Deaths from uterine cancer
Deaths from cancer in Turkey
Women association football referees
Women's association footballers not categorized by position